Harold Benjamin Fantham (1876 — 1937) was a zoologist and in particular a parasitologist who contributed to major discoveries in the fields and was the senior author of prominent works including standard textbooks in the field.

1876 births
1937 deaths
British zoologists
Presidents of the Southern Africa Association for the Advancement of Science